Varpol may refer to:

Varpol, Dowreh